Lee Won-hee (born July 19, 1981) is a South Korean quadruple judo champion. Lee won the gold medal in the men's lightweight division at the 2004 Summer Olympics in Athens, Greece. He was the world champion in 2003. He also won the gold medal in 2006 Asian Games and 2003 Asian Judo Championships.

He won his Olympic gold medal by way of Ippon against Vitaly Makarov of Russia with 9 seconds left. He was leading in the bout anyway, but had secured the win when he went in for Drop Seoi Nage and combined it with Ko-Ouchi Gari to deliver Makarov onto his back with force. He was voted top judoka in the 2004 Olympics. Lee was renowned for his favourite technique Tai Otoshi.

Lee is arguably one of the best South Korean judokas ever to live. During his active career, he was nicknamed "Mr. Ippon" and "Grand Slammer" for his 48-game winning streak, of which, 43 were won by ippon. He lost to Wang Ki-chun in the qualifications for the 2007 World Championships in Rio de Janeiro and 2008 Olympics in Beijing.

Lee taught judo at his alma mater Yong In University. In 2015, he was promoted to head coach of the South Korean Women's Judo National Team.

Personal life 
Lee attended Boseong Middle School. He is believed to have an IQ of 148.

In 2008, Lee married golfer Kim Mi-hyun, and they have a son, Yeseong. The couple divorced in 2012.

In 2018, Lee married South Korean table tennis player Yun Ji-Hye and have a daughter together.

References

External links
 

Judoka at the 2004 Summer Olympics
Olympic judoka of South Korea
Olympic gold medalists for South Korea
Yong In University alumni
1981 births
Living people
Sportspeople from Seoul
Olympic medalists in judo
Asian Games medalists in judo
World judo champions
Judoka at the 2006 Asian Games
South Korean male judoka
Medalists at the 2004 Summer Olympics
Asian Games gold medalists for South Korea
Medalists at the 2006 Asian Games
Universiade medalists in judo
Universiade gold medalists for South Korea